The Ramrocks or Buck Ram's Ramrocks were an American rock band of the 1950s led by Buck Ram. They toured as the backing band of Ray Scott.

Discography
A: Hot Rock B: On The Rocks  1958
A: The Great Pretender B: Humrock  1959
The Flares A: Foot Stompin' - Part 1 The Ramrocks B: Foot Stompin' - Part 2 1961	
 A: Lasagna B: Pasha  	1962	
A: Odd Man Theme B: Benfica Press Records 1962

References

American rock music groups